Toni Abela (born July 2, 1957) is a Maltese politician who was elected as Deputy Leader (Party Affairs) of the Malta Labour Party in June 2008. A lawyer by profession, he co-drafted Malta's Whistle Blower Act, Party Financing Act and the law that removed politicians' legal protection from cases of abuse and corruption.   He was nominated by the Government of Malta to serve as a member of the European Court of Auditors but this nomination was rejected. He is now a judge presiding over the First Hall of the Civil Court of Malta.

Political career

President (1988 - 1989) 

In 1988, he was elected President of the Labour Party and served until 1989 when he had to resign from the party after taking a stand against corruption and criminal elements within the party.

Co-founder of Malta's Green Party (1989) 

That same year, he co-founded Alternattiva Demokratika, Malta's Green Party, together with the then Labour Party whip Wenzu Mintoff, espousing environmental issues, equality of gender, political transparency and a fairer electoral system with the introduction of a national quota to allow small political parties to be represented in Parliament on the line of the German model. Campaigned in favour of the introduction of the Whistle Blower Act, Freedom of Information Act, the abolishment of the institute of prescription in case of abuse of power and corruption by public officials and the need of a Party Financing Law.

Deputy Mayor of Hamrun (1993) 

In 1993 he was elected as Deputy Mayor of Hamrun, a major town in Malta, and was responsible for law enforcement and management of the citizens' complaints bureau. He also introduced the first bye-laws and established the first local Court.

Labour Party Deputy Leader (Party Affairs) (2008 - 2016) 

He was elected Deputy Leader for Party Affairs on 12 June 2008. Apart from his general responsibilities of running and managing the Party's internal affairs, he also monitored 65 political Labour Party outlets. He also set standards of good governance to 39 Labour Local Councils and saw that these standards are upheld. During his tenure, Labour Party went through radical changes at all levels of organisation.
 Allegations of drug cover-up
During the 2013 General Election campaign a recording emerged of Abela's admitting knowledge to a large quantity of cocaine being kept at a Labour Party club. The recording infers that, rather than reporting the matter to the police, Abela personally dealt with it internally. However, the Police Commissioner stated that there was no case against Toni Abela.

See also 
Judiciary of Malta

References

Living people
1957 births
Labour Party (Malta) politicians
Democratic Alternative (Malta) politicians
20th-century Maltese politicians
21st-century Maltese politicians